Vanua Levu (pronounced ), formerly known as Sandalwood Island, is the second largest island of Fiji.

Geology 
Fiji lies in a tectonically complex area between the Australian Plate and the Pacific Plate. The Fiji Platform lies in a zone bordered with active extension fault lines around which most of the shallow earthquakes were centred. These fault lines are the Fiji Fracture Zone (FFZ) to the north, the 176° Extension Zone (176°E EZ) to the west, and the Hunter Fracture Zone (HFZ) and Lau Ridge to the east.

Mio-Pliocene sandstones and marl grade into epiclastics and andesitic volcanics of the Suva Group. The Group forms the Korotini Tableland in the middle of the island, it includes the peaks of Seseleka, Ndelanathau, Nararo, Valili, Mariko, Mount Nasorolevu, Ndikeva, and Uluingala. The Pliocene Undu Group in the northeastern portion of the island, consists of breccia, tuff, and flows of rhyolite and dacite overlain by pumiceous strata. The Plio-Pleistocene Mba Grouop is found on the southwestern portion of the island and consists of porphyritic basalt flows and volcanoclastics grading into greywacke. The Group includes the peak of Navotuvotu and the Mt. Kasi Mine.

Geography 

This point, the northernmost in the Fiji chain, is Udu Point. From the southeastern side of this triangle, a long peninsula stretches out into the Koro Sea. The island is rough and hilly, and is surrounded by coral reefs, including Cakaulevu Reef, a long barrier reef off the northern shore. The antimeridian passes through this island, just touching its northeastern tip.

A rugged mountain range divides the island horizontally, forming much of the boundary between the Provinces of Cakaudrove and Macuata. Vanua Levu's main mountain ranges lie near the windward, southern coasts, making them much wetter. Northern Vanua Levu, by contrast, has a dry climate eight months of the year, enabling sugar cane, the island's major crop, to thrive there. Vanua Levu has a number of rivers, including the Labasa, the Wailevu, and the Qawa. These three form a delta on which the town of Labasa stands. None of the island's rivers are navigable by large vessels. There are also many well known rivers on Vanua levu. The first is the most dangerous river, the Wainikoro river, known for its shark attacks. The second is the Dreketi river, the deepest river in Fiji.

Flora and fauna 

A  area covering much of the interior of the Natewa/Tunuloa peninsula is the Natewa/Tunuloa Peninsula Important Bird Area. The Important Bird Area covers the largest tracts of remaining old-growth forest on the peninsula, which is on the south of Vanua Levu, and it supports a population of vulnerable shy ground doves.

Demographics and economic activities 

The island's main population centres are the towns of Labasa, in the north, and Savusavu, located at the foot of the peninsula. Labasa, with a population of almost 25,000 at the 1996 census, has a large Indian community, and is a major centre of Fiji's sugar industry. Savusavu is smaller, with a population of just under 5000, but is a popular centre for tourists owing to its diving and yachting facilities. The main industry on the island is sugar cane production, especially in the north. Copra is also an important crop. Tourism is now becoming a major industry on Vanua Levu also.

Politics 
For administrative purposes, Vanua Levu is divided into three Provinces: Bua (in the west), Macuata (in the north-east), and Cakaudrove (in the south-east). These three provinces also comprise the Northern Division of Fiji. Together with the remote Lau Islands, Vanua Levu and its outliers form the Tovata Confederacy, one of three traditional alliances of Fiji's chiefs. The Paramount Chief, who is based on the nearby island of Taveuni, holds the title of Tui Cakau. Only two population centres - Labasa and Savusavu - have been incorporated as Towns. Each is governed by a Mayor and a Town Council, whose members are elected for a three-year term and choose the Mayor from among themselves. At present, normative local body governance is in abeyance, and all cities and towns in Fiji are being run temporarily by Special Administrators appointed by the central government.

History 

Vanua Levu was settled about 3,100 years ago, with the settlers living in houses raised above the reefs on the shores. Between 1250 and 1350 the Pacific sea level fell , exposing the tops of the reefs. This killed the abundant sea food, it also dropped the ground water table below the depth of the roots of the crops. The scarcity of food caused conflict and war. In response, the people moved from seaside villages, for mountaintop fortified villages. These forts were occupied until about 1870, with the last clear indication of warfare about 1860.

The Dutch navigator Abel Tasman was the first known European to sight Vanua Levu, in 1643. He was followed by Captain William Bligh in 1789, en route to Timor while escaping from the Mutiny on the Bounty, in which his crew had forced him and those loyal to him off deck and cast them adrift in a launch. Captain James Wilson subsequently explored the area in 1797 in his ship Duff.

Traders began exploiting sandalwood thickets in the Bua Bay area around 1805, which had been discovered by shipwrecked sailors of the schooner Argo. By 1815, however, the supply had been depleted and apart from the occasional visit from whalers and bêche-de-mer traders, the island received little further attention until 1840, when a young sailor known as Jackson  deserted his crew at Somosomo on the nearby island of Taveuni, was adopted by a local Chief, and explored much of eastern and northern Vanua Levu.

Settlers from Australia and New Zealand established coconut plantations in the Savusavu area in the 1860s. Intermarriage with Fijian people produced a mixed-race elite, which also prospered from the sale of copra, of which Savusavu was a major centre, until the Great Depression of the 1930s led to a collapse in the price of copra. In the same period, Indians founded the town of Labasa, now a major sugar-producing centre.

In March 2012, the nation of Kiribati began negotiating to buy  of the island to house its population, which is expected to need to move as their islands are inundated by rising sea levels.

On December 19, 2020, at least four were killed and millions of dollars in damage as Cyclone Yasa slammed into the island. 24,000 people were evacuated from their homes.

Transport
Ferry service by Patterson Brothers Shipping Company LTD connects Vanua Levu to Viti Levu and  Ovalau.

References

External links 
 Biodiversity Conservation in the Delaikoro Mountain Ecosystem, Vanua Levu, Fiji, Rudolf Hahn FAO 2015 youtube video

 
Islands of Fiji
Important Bird Areas of Fiji